John Alexander "Rex" MacLeod (March 30, 1921 – April 7, 1995), was a Canadian sports journalist. A columnist for The Globe and Mail and Toronto Star, he won the Elmer Ferguson Memorial Award in 1987 and is a member of the media section of the Hockey Hall of Fame. MacLeod served in World War II with the Royal Canadian Air Force and entered the newspaper industry after the war, with the Guelph Mercury. He retired in 1987.

References

1921 births
1995 deaths
Canadian sports journalists
Elmer Ferguson Award winners
Royal Canadian Air Force personnel of World War II